Communitas perfecta ("perfect community") or societas perfecta ("perfect society") is the Latin name given to one of several ecclesiological, canonical, and political theories of the Catholic Church. The doctrine teaches that the church is a self-sufficient or independent group which already has all the necessary resources and conditions to achieve its overall goal (final end) of the universal salvation of mankind. It has historically been used in order to define church–state relations and to provide a theoretical basis for the legislative powers of the church in the philosophy of Catholic canon law.

Communitas perfecta in Aristotle
Its origins can be traced to the Politics of Aristotle, who described the Polis as a whole made of several imperfect parts, i.e. the consummation of natural communities such as the family and the village. The "perfect community" was originally developed as a theory of political society. The most sovereign political organization (the Polis)  can attain the end of the community as a whole (happiness) better than any of the subordinate parts of the community (family, village, etc.). Since it can attain its end (telos) by its own powers and the resources within itself, then it is self-sufficient. It is self-sufficiency that is the defining element of the polis.

Scholastic development

The idea of "perfect community" was also present in medieval philosophy. In direct reference to Aristotle, Thomas Aquinas mentions the state (civitas) as a perfect community (communitas perfecta):

Aquinas never referred to the church as a perfect community in his writings. If Aquinas and medieval writers had any notion of communitas perfecta being applied to the church, it was not clearly expressed and was not a clear basis for the societas perfecta theory used in later controversies between church and state.

Magisterial adoption

During Enlightenment period, the Societas Perfecta doctrine was strongly affirmed in order to better protect the church from secular encroachments. It was also mentioned in the magisterium of the Thomistic revivalist pontiffs such as Pius IX. And especially Leo XIII, in his encyclical Immortale Dei,  explains this teaching in relation to the church: 

The two perfect societies correspond to two forces, the church and state:

Developments in the post-conciliar period
Until the Second Vatican Council, the doctrine of the two perfect societies of Leo XIII was held to be official in theological studies. During the council itself, as well as in the new 1983 Code of Canon Law itself, the doctrine was no longer explicitly mentioned and the Aristotelian "Perfect Community" was all but replaced by the biblical "People of God". In the modern Catholic post-conciliar theology, its discussion is limited to theologians and academics. Its near-abandonment in discourse has proven controversial.

In any event, Pope Paul VI mentioned it and summarized it in the 1969 motu proprio Sollicitudo omnium ecclesiarum on the tasks of the papal legate: 

This theology was largely overshadowed by the biblical theology of the church as the mystici corporis Christi (mystical body of Christ), which began to be more fully developed in the early 20th century and was affirmed by Pope Pius XII in 1943.

References

Footnotes

Bibliography 

 Böckenförde, Ernst-Wolfgang. State - Society - The Church, in: Writings on the State - Society - Church III, Freiburg 1990, p. 113-211 
 Graham, Robert A., S.J. Vatican Diplomacy: A Study of Church and State on the International Plane (Princeton, New Jersey: Princeton University Press, 1959).
 Listl, Joseph. Church and State in the recent Catholic Church Law, Berlin 1978

Catholic ecclesiology
Christian theology and politics
Aristotelianism
Political philosophy
Catholic Church legal terminology
Thomistic jurisprudence
Utopian theory